Douglas Allan Kotar (June 11, 1951 – December 16, 1983) was an American football running back for the New York Giants of the National Football League.

Early years
Raised in Muse, Pennsylvania, Kotar graduated from Canon-McMillan High School and played college football at the University of Kentucky in

Career
Unselected in the 1974 NFL Draft, he was signed as an undrafted free agent by the  Four days later, they traded him to the Giants (for Leo Gasienica), where he played for eight years. Linebacker Harry Carson, a teammate for six seasons, once described him as "a fighter you'd like to have with you in a 

Though he was only , Kotar rushed for 3,380 yards (while also receiving 1,022 yards) in his career, which was fourth most in Giants history, now ninth. Kotar was known for leading with his head while rushing, a fact that would come back to haunt him in later life.

Retirement and later death
Kotar retired after the first days training camp in July 1982, attributed to his knees and shoulder hurting, citing his family. Unfortunately, Kotar experienced massive  After concerns were expressed by his family, he had a CAT scan. Only weeks into his retirement, the doctors found a brain tumor. Kotar decided to go through with invasive surgery that involved opening his skull up. However, the doctors found that the tumor was malignant, and it could not be removed. By this point, his savings were wiped out due to the medical treatments.

Kotar would later experience partial paralysis and was moved to his hometown, undergoing radiation treatment over the next few months. Only four months before his death, he was visited by 45 Giant players, officials, and coaches. Carson later stated he was going to visit Kotar again as soon as the season ended, but he never got to as he died in his sleep just 16 months after diagnosis 

He and his wife Donna (aged thirty) had two young children at the time of his death: Doug Jr. (aged ten) and

References

External links

Sports Reference – college football – Doug Kotar

1951 births
1983 deaths
People from Canonsburg, Pennsylvania
American football running backs
Players of American football from Pennsylvania
 American people of Hungarian descent
New York Giants players
Kentucky Wildcats football players
Deaths from brain cancer in the United States